Alldritt Tower is an approved 80 storey mixed use skyscraper in Edmonton, Alberta. It could be the tallest building in Western Canada and one of the tallest buildings in the country.

References

See also
List of tallest buildings in Edmonton

Proposed skyscrapers in Canada
Skyscrapers in Edmonton